The Best of David Bowie 1969/1974 is a compilation album by English singer-songwriter David Bowie, released by EMI in 1997. The US release of the album was pulled from the stores because of multiple inaccuracies in the credits and liner notes. It was re-released by EMI-CAPITOL Entertainment Properties the following year (1998) in the US as part of the essential collection, with a new cover and corrected information as a limited edition.  This album was also included as the first disc of the compilation The Platinum Collection (2005/2006).

There are three uncredited rarities included on the album. They are: "John, I'm Only Dancing" (Sax version) – recorded during the sessions for the Aladdin Sane album; "The Prettiest Star" (Marc Bolan stereo version) – the original 1970 single release that features Marc Bolan on lead guitar; and "All the Young Dudes (Studio version)" – the original Bowie studio version from 1973.

Track listing
All songs written by David Bowie, except where noted.

Charts

Certifications

References

Albums produced by Ken Scott
Albums produced by David Bowie
Best of 1969 1974, The
Best of 1969 1974, The
EMI Records compilation albums